Coventry House Publishing, LLC is an American non-fiction book imprint located in Dublin, Ohio.

Notable authors
 Jake Anderson, TV personality on Deadliest Catch
 Josh Flagg, TV personality on Million Dollar Listing Los Angeles
 Madison Hildebrand, TV personality on Million Dollar Listing Los Angeles
 Kristin Tate, political commentator on Fox News Channel
 Burke Badenhop, baseball player for Boston Red Sox
 Jon Leiberman, radio personality on The Howard Stern Show

Awards
Melanie Lockert, Finalist at 7th Annual Plutus Awards
 Stefanie O'Connell, Finalist at 6th Annual Plutus Awards

References

External links 
 Coventry House Publishing, 

Publishing companies established in 2012
Book publishing companies based in Ohio
Book publishing companies of the United States
Publishing companies of the United States
Companies based in Dublin, Ohio
Companies based in the Columbus, Ohio metropolitan area